Madonna is a 1989 Hindi-language platinum-selling pop album by Indipop star Alisha Chinai.

The album is mainly Hindi-language covers of songs by the American singer Madonna, and the cover shows Alisha wearing provocative clothes similar to Madonna's at the period. The album was promoted with a four city tour. The Indian press reported that the American singer had actually acknowledged Alisha's tribute, but a reaction came from Indian rapper Baba Sehgal who responded to Alisha's tour and album with a lampoon song "Madonna", where he also dressed as the American singer.

Track listing

References

External links
 Alisha Chinai – Madonna at RajeshJhaveri.com

1989 albums
Hindi-language albums
Alisha Chinai albums
Madonna tribute albums